The 1981 Quebec general election was held on April 13, 1981, to elect members of the National Assembly of the Province of Quebec, Canada. The incumbent Parti Québécois, led by Premier René Lévesque, won re-election, defeating the Quebec Liberal Party, led by Claude Ryan.

The PQ won re-election despite having lost the 1980 Quebec referendum on sovereignty-association, the party's proposal for political independence for Quebec in an economic union with the rest of Canada.  To some extent, they were helped by Claude Ryan's old-fashioned campaign style: he refused to tailor sound bites for the evening news and ran a campaign generally unsuited for television coverage.  Despite finishing only three percent behind the PQ, the Liberals still finished a distant second, with 42 seats to the PQ's 80. Historically, provincial elections in Quebec produce large disparities between the popular vote and the actual seat count.

The Union Nationale, which had won 11 seats in a modest comeback in the 1976 general election, was reduced to five seats at dissolution by numerous floor crossings, retirements and resignations.  Among the departures was that of its leader in the 1976 election, Rodrigue Biron, who crossed the floor to the PQ.  The once-proud party lost all of its remaining seats, never to return.  The party essentially ended at this point, though it lingered in desultory fashion until 1989.

Results
The overall results were:

See also
 List of Quebec premiers
 Politics of Quebec
 Timeline of Quebec history
 List of Quebec political parties
 32nd National Assembly of Quebec

External links
 CBC TV video clip
 Results by party (total votes and seats won)
 Results for all ridings

References

Further reading 
 

Quebec general election
Elections in Quebec
General election
Quebec general election